The 1971 Washington Senators season involved the Senators finishing fifth in the American League East with a record of 63 wins and 96 losses. This was the Senators' eleventh and last season in Washington, D.C.; they moved to Arlington, Texas, and became the Texas Rangers in 1972. The previous Senators (now Minnesota Twins) were in Washington from 1901 through 1960.

The move to Texas left Washington without a Major League Baseball team for 33 seasons, until the Montreal Expos of the National League relocated there in 2005 and became the current Washington Nationals.

Offseason 

 October 9, 1970: Ed Brinkman, Aurelio Rodríguez, Joe Coleman, and Jim Hannan were traded by the Senators to the Detroit Tigers for Denny McLain, Elliott Maddox, Norm McRae, and Don Wert.
 November 3, 1970: Greg Goossen and Gene Martin were traded by the Senators to the Philadelphia Phillies for Curt Flood and a player to be named. The Phillies completed the deal by sending Jeff Terpko to the Senators on April 10, 1971.
 November 30, 1970: Joe Foy was drafted by the Washington Senators from the New York Mets in the 1970 rule 5 draft.
 March 29, 1971: Ed Stroud was traded by the Senators to the Chicago White Sox for Tommy McCraw.

Regular season 
The acquisition of former Cy Young Award winner Denny McLain did not pay dividends for the franchise. Amid constant run-ins with no-nonsense Washington manager Ted Williams, McLain lost 22 games in 1971.

Relocation to Texas 
By the end of the 1970 season, Senators owner Bob Short had issued an ultimatum: unless someone was willing to buy the Senators for $12 million, he would not renew his lease at RFK Stadium and move elsewhere. Several parties offered to buy the team, but all fell short of Short's asking price.

Short was especially receptive to an offer from Arlington mayor Tom Vandergriff, who had been trying to get a major league team to play in the Metroplex for over a decade. Years earlier, Charlie Finley, the owner of the Kansas City Athletics, sought to move his team to Dallas, but the idea was rebuffed by the other AL team owners.

Arlington's hole card was Turnpike Stadium, a 10,000-seat park which opened in 1965 to house the AA Dallas–Fort Worth Spurs of the Texas League. Built to major league specifications, it was located in a natural bowl, and only minor excavations were necessary to expand the park to major-league size.

After Vandergriff offered a multimillion-dollar up-front payment, Short finally decided to pull up stakes and move. On September 20, 1971, he got his wish, receiving approval from AL owners to move the franchise to Arlington for the 1972 season.

Washington fans were outraged, leaving public relations director Ted Rodgers with the unenviable task of putting a positive spin on such events as fans unfurling a giant banner that contained Short's name, preceded by a popular four-letter invective. A photo of the banner appeared on the front page of a DC newspaper the following day.

Fan enmity came to a head in the team's last game in Washington, on September 30. Thousands of fans simply walked in without paying because the security guards left early in the game, swelling the paid attendance of 14,460 to around 25,000. The Senators led 7–5 with two outs in the top of the ninth. Just then, fans poured onto the field, thinking the final out had already been made. A teenager scooped up first base and ran away. With no security guards in sight, the game was forfeited to the Yankees, 9–0.

Opening Day starters 
Dick Bosman
Paul Casanova
Tim Cullen
Mike Epstein
Curt Flood
Joe Foy
Toby Harrah
Frank Howard
Elliott Maddox

Season standings

Record vs. opponents

Notable transactions 
 May 8: Darold Knowles and Mike Epstein were traded to the Oakland Athletics for Frank Fernández, Don Mincher, Paul Lindblad, and cash.
 June 8: 1971 Major League Baseball draft
Stan Thomas was selected in the 27th round.
Mike Cubbage was selected in the second round of the secondary phase.
 July 16: Joe Foy was released.
 September 27: Jim French was released.

Roster

Player stats

Batting

Starters by position 
Note: Pos = Position; G = Games played; AB = At bats; H = Hits; Avg. = Batting average; HR = Home runs; RBI = Runs batted in

Other batters 
Note: G = Games played; AB = At bats; H = Hits; Avg. = Batting average; HR = Home runs; RBI = Runs batted in

Pitching

Starting pitchers 
Note: G = Games pitched; IP = Innings pitched; W = Wins; L = Losses; ERA = Earned run average; SO = Strikeouts

Other pitchers 
Note: G = Games pitched; IP = Innings pitched; W = Wins; L = Losses; ERA = Earned run average; SO = Strikeouts

Relief pitchers 
Note: G = Games pitched; W = Wins; L = Losses; SV = Saves; ERA = Earned run average; SO = Strikeouts

Farm system 

LEAGUE CHAMPIONS: Denver

Notes

References 

1971 Washington Senators team page at Baseball Reference
1971 Washington Senators team page at www.baseball-almanac.com

Texas Rangers seasons
Washington Senators season
Washing